Senator Schroeder may refer to:

Frederick A. Schroeder (1833–1899), New York State Senate
Jack Schroeder (1925–2017), Iowa State Senate
Ted F. Schroeder (1902–1979), Washington State Senate
Wil Schroder (born 1982), Kentucky State Senate